New Turkey Party was a former Turkish political party.

Background 
Democrat Party which was the ruling party of Turkey between 1950 and 1960 was closed by the military rule in 1960. In 1961, a number of new parties were founded to fill the political gap of Democrat Party. New Turkey Party was one of them.

Foundation of the party 
The founder of the party was Ekrem Alican, a former Democrat Party deputy prior to 1957 .
He had also worked for the military rule as a Minister of Finance. The party was founded on 13 February 1961. Other important figures in the party were Yüksel Menderes (Adnan Menderes' son), Aydın Yalçın (academician), Fahrettin Kerim Gökay (former İstanbul mayor) and Yusuf Azizoğlu, (MD and former Silvan mayor).

Political history 
In the elections held on 15 October 1961 the party received 13.7% of all votes and gained 65 seats in the lower house of the parliament.  It was the third party in terms of the seats and fourth party in terms of the votes. The party participated in the 27th government of Turkey (also known as the second coalition government) in which Ekrem Alican was the deputy prime minister between 25 January 1962 and 25 December 1963. In the elections held on 10 October 1965 YTP received only 3.7% of votes and gained 19 seats. In the elections held on 12 October 1969, the vote percentage of votes further dropped to 2.2%.

Conclusion 
In 1973 the party ceased to exist, and the remaining members transferred to other parties notably to Justice Party.

References 

 
Defunct political parties in Turkey
Political parties established in 1961
1961 establishments in Turkey
Political parties disestablished in 1973
1973 disestablishments in Turkey